Elections to City of Lincoln Council in Lincolnshire, England, were held on 6 May 1999. The whole council was up for election with boundary changes since the last election in 1998. The Labour party stayed in overall control of the Council.

Election result

All comparisons in vote share are to the corresponding 1995 election.

Ward results

Abbey

Birchwood

Boultham

Bracebridge

Carholme

Castle

Glebe

Hartsholme

Minster

Moorland

Park

References

1999 English local elections
1999
1990s in Lincolnshire